Judge Carney may refer to:

Cormac J. Carney (born 1959), judge of the United States District Court for the Central District of California
Susan L. Carney (born 1951), judge of the United States Court of Appeals for the Second Circuit.

See also
Justice Carney (disambiguation)